Wahyu Gunawan (born November 10, 1985 in Malang, East Java) is an Indonesian footballer who currently plays for Deltras in the Indonesia Super League as a defender and midfielder.

References

External links 
 Wahyu Gunawan on deltras-fc.com

Living people
Indonesian footballers
1985 births
Association football midfielders
Sportspeople from Malang
Association football defenders
Arema F.C. players
Deltras F.C. players
21st-century Indonesian people